Marella Agnelli (born Donna Marella Caracciolo di Castagneto ; 4 May 1927 – 23 February 2019) was an Italian noblewoman, art collector, socialite, style icon, and wife of Fiat S.p.A. chairman Gianni Agnelli. She often appeared in the fashion magazine Vogue. She was named to the International Best Dressed Hall of Fame List in 1963.

Background 
Donna Marella Caracciolo di Castagneto was born in Florence, Kingdom of Italy, as a member of the House of Caracciolo of the high Italian nobility and aristocracy. Her father was Don Filippo Caracciolo, 8th Prince of Castagneto, 3rd Duke of Melito, and hereditary Patrician of Naples (1903–1965), from an old noble Neapolitan family dating back to the Kingdom of Naples; he took part in the Italian resistance movement, was the executive secretary of the National Liberation Committee, an undersecretary of the Italian Ministry of Foreign Affairs in the Second Badoglio government, helped overcome objections for the Italian Communist Party to join the government, became secretary for the Action Party, and was general-secretary of the Council of Europe.

Her mother was Margaret Clarke (1898–1955) of Peoria, Illinois, the heiress of a well-known family of whiskey producers; she hanged her mother's portraits in roomscapes of wicker furniture and sprigged cotton. She had two brothers: Don Carlo Caracciolo (1925–2008), who inherited their father's titles in 1965 and founded the Gruppo Editoriale L'Espresso and newspaper La Repubblica, and was known as "a prince among newspaper editors", or as "the editor prince", a reference to his aristocratic birth and elegant manner; and Don Nicola Caracciolo (1931–2020), the holder of both titles since 2008, as 10th Prince of Castagneto, 5th Duke of Melito, and hereditary Patrician of Naples. They grew up in Rome and Turkey, and spoke Italian, French, and English.

Family 
She was married in Osthoffen to Gianni Agnelli, the Fiat tycoon who was widely referred to as "the uncrowned king of Italy", on 19 November 1953; they would remain married until his death on 24 January 2003. In their 50-year marriage, they had two children and eight nephews:
 Edoardo Agnelli (9 July 1954 –  15 November 2000)
 Countess Margherita Agnelli de Pahlen (born 26 October 1955); married first in 1975 (divorcing in 1981) to Alain Elkann (born 23 March 1950) and second in 1991 to a Russian nobleman, Count Sergei de Pahlen (born in 1944)
 John Philip Jacob Elkann (born 1 April 1976), married on 4 September 2004 Italian noblewoman Donna Lavinia Ida Borromeo Arese Taverna (born 10 March 1977)
 Leone Mosé Elkann (born 27 August 2006)
 Oceano Noah Elkann (born 11 November 2007)
 Vita Talita Elkann (born 23 January 2012)
 Lapo Edovard Elkann (born 7 October 1977), married on 7 October 2021 to Portuguese rally racer Joana Lemos (born 24 April 1973)
 Ginevra Elkann (born 24 September 1979), married on 25 April 2009 Italian aristocrat Don Giovanni Gaetani dell'Aquila d'Aragona (born 2 May 1973)
 Don Giacomo Gaetani dell'Aquila d'Aragona (born 15 August 2009)
 Don Pietro Gaetani dell'Aquila d'Aragona (born 31 October 2012)
 Donna Marella Gaetani dell'Aquila d'Aragona  (born 27 May 2014)
 Countess Maria de Pahlen (born in 1983)
 Count Pierre de Pahlen (born in 1986)
 Countess Sophie de Pahlen (born in 1988)
 Countess Anna de Pahlen (born in 1988)
 Countess Tatiana de Pahlen (born in 1990)

Into the 2020s, the de Pahlens remain involved in a dispute with the Elkanns over Agnelli's inheritance.

Career 

After Agnelli obtained her diploma in Switzerland, she was educated in Paris, where she attended the Académie des Beaux-Arts and then the Académie Julian in Paris. As part of her varied career, which included photography, design, and art collection, as well as a modeling career, Agnelli began her photography career as an assistant to Erwin Blumenfeld in New York City, where she lived on Park Avenue on the Upper East Side. When she returned to Italy, Agnelli was also an occasional editor and photographic contributor to Vogue and Condé Nast, among other magazines. In 1973, she created a textile line for Abraham-Zumsteg, for which she was awarded the Resources Council's Roscoe (the design trade's equivalent of the Oscar) in 1977. This was followed by work for the Ratti in Como, Steiner factories in France, and for Martex and numerous others for Marshall Field's in the United States. She specialized in furnishing fabrics.

An avid gardener, Agnelli authored a number of books on the subject, also providing many of the photographs. Two of her books are about the Agnelli Gardens at Villar Perosa, such as The Agnelli Gardens at Villar Perosa: Two Centuries of a Family Retreat (1998), and the Garden of Ninfa, such as Il giardino di Ninfa (1999). Into the 21st century, she oversaw the opening of the Renzo Piano-designed art gallery Pinacoteca Giovanni e Marella Agnelli, built on the roof of the former Lingotto Fiat factory in Turin. The Agnelli collection includes Picasso, Renoir, Canaletto, Matisse, and Canova masterpieces, and opened in 2002. The gallery also puts on temporary modern art exhibitions. She commissioned art from the likes of Andy Warhol and Richard Avedon.

In 1970, Agnelli founded the National Commission of United World Colleges. She was a member of the International Board of Trustees of the Salk Institute for Biological Studies in San Diego, California, and of the International Council of the Museum of Modern Art in New York. Among others, she was also vice-president of the Council of Palazzo Grassi in Venice, as well as president of I 200 del Fai in Milan and of the Association of Turin Friends of Contemporary Art in Turin.

The Swans 
The reserved, patrician tastemaker, and socialite Agnelli was known for her inclusion in Truman Capote's the Swans, a circle of wealthy, stylish, and well-married women friends whose company he adored because, in his words, they "had created themselves, as he had done", and "had stories to tell". According to Capote, Agnelli was "the European swan numero uno", one of the youngest in a group that included Babe Paley, Gloria Guinness, C. Z. Guest, Slim Keith, Pamela Harriman, Lee Radziwill, and Jacqueline Kennedy Onassis.  In her autobiography, Washington Post publisher and Capote friend Katharine Graham recounted that the author once told her that if Paley and Agnelli were "both in Tiffany's window, Marella would be more expensive." Agnelli herself was nicknamed the Swan by Richard Avedon for a 1949 photograph that appeared on Vogue; Agnelli was among the notable photos Avedon took. Her other nickname, the Last Swan, was coined by Capote.

Death 
After a long illness, Agnelli died at the age of 91 on 23 February 2019 at her home in Turin; the announcement was made by her family. Days prior to her death, Agnelli's health deteriored, and the cause of death was ruled to be from complications of Parkinson's disease; she had been in a condition of invalidity for several years, and in her last months she was artificially fed. The funeral was held in a strictly private form on 25 February 2019 in the church of San Pietro in Vincoli at Villar Perosa. At the end of the ritual, her body was buried in the family chapel in the city cemetery. Among others, she was mourned by association football club Juventus, which is owned by the Agnelli family.

Popular culture 
Agnelli was portrayed in the American biographical film Infamous (2006) by Isabella Rossellini.

Books

Honours 
  Grand Officer Order of Merit of the Italian Republic, the third-highest civil honour in Italy, it was awarded by then president Carlo Azeglio Ciampi on 13 September 2000.

Ancestry

References

Further reading

External links 

 Marella Agnelli at Goodreads (in English)
 Marella Agnelli at Elegancepedia (in English and Italian)
 Marella Agnelli portrait by Andy Warhol at Jablonka Galerie
 Maralla Agnelli at Style.com (in English)
 Pinacoteca Agnelli (in Italian)
 Quilling – Devotional Creations from Cloistered Orders at Pinacoteca Agnelli (in English)

1927 births
2019 deaths
20th-century American non-fiction writers
20th-century American women artists
20th-century art collectors
20th-century Italian writers
20th-century Italian women writers
21st-century American non-fiction writers
21st-century American women artists
21st-century art collectors
21st-century Italian writers
21st-century Italian women writers
Marella
American art collectors
American autobiographers
American garden writers
American landscape and garden designers
American socialites
American textile designers
American women photographers
Artists from New York City
Deaths from Parkinson's disease
Grand Officers of the Order of Merit of the Italian Republic
Marella
Italian art collectors
Italian autobiographers
Italian designers
Italian emigrants to the United States
Italian people of American descent
Italian photographers
Italian princesses
Italian socialites
Neurological disease deaths in Piedmont
Nobility from Florence
People from the Upper East Side
Photographers from New York (state)
Women art collectors
Women autobiographers
Writers from Manhattan